Ziad Derbali (born 11 October 1984) is a Tunisian footballer who plays as a defender, most recently for Al-Shorta in the Iraqi Premier League and the Tunisian third-tier club Oasis Sportive Kébili.

Honours
ES Tunis
Tunisian Cup: 2007–08
North African Cup Winners Cup: 2008
Tunisian Ligue Professionnelle 1: 2008–09, 2009–10
Arab Champions League: 2008–09

CS Sfaxien
CAF Confederation Cup: 2013

Al-Muharraq
Bahraini Premier League: 2017–18
Bahraini Super Cup: 2018

Al-Shorta
Iraqi Premier League: 2018–19

References

External links

1984 births
Living people
Tunisian footballers
Tunisian Ligue Professionnelle 1 players
Olympique Béja players
Espérance Sportive de Tunis players
US Monastir (football) players
CS Sfaxien players
Al-Muharraq SC players
Al-Shorta SC players
Association football defenders
Tunisian expatriate footballers
Expatriate footballers in Iraq
Tunisian expatriate sportspeople in Iraq
Expatriate footballers in Bahrain
Tunisian expatriate sportspeople in Bahrain
Tunisia A' international footballers
2016 African Nations Championship players